Henry Bacon (November 28, 1866February 16, 1924) was an American Beaux-Arts architect who is best remembered for the Lincoln Memorial in Washington, D.C. (built 1915–1922), which was his final project.

Education and early career 
Henry Bacon was born in Watseka, Illinois. He studied briefly at the University of Illinois, Urbana (1884), but left to begin his architectural career as a draftsman. He worked in the office of McKim, Mead & White in New York City, one of the best-known architectural firms. Bacon's works of that period were in the late Greek Revival and Beaux-Arts architectures associated with the firm, which included the 1889 Paris World Expo, the Boston Public Library, the New York Herald Building, the Harvard Club of New York, Columbia University's Morningside Heights campus, the World's Columbian Exposition in Chicago in 1893, and New York's Pennsylvania Station, among others.

While at McKim, Mead & White, Bacon won, in 1889, the Rotch Traveling Scholarship for architectural students. This gave him two years of study and travel in Europe, which he spent learning and drawing details of Roman and Greek architecture. In Turkey, he met his future wife, Laura Florence Calvert, daughter of a British consul. He traveled with another fellowship student, Albert Kahn of Detroit, Michigan, who would become a leading industrial architect.

Full career
After returning to the U.S., Bacon worked for a few more years with his mentor, Charles McKim, including on such projects as the Rhode Island State House in Providence, Rhode Island. He served as McKim's personal representative in Paris during the Paris World's Exposition (1889)] and in Chicago for the World's Columbian Exposition of 1893, for which McKim, Mead & White was designing several buildings.

In 1897, Bacon left with James Brite, a younger architect from the firm, to found the partnership of Brite and Bacon Architects. Brite was in charge of financial, administrative and contracting aspects of the partnership, while Bacon was in charge of the architectural design and construction. The partnership immediately won the competition for the Jersey City Public Library and the Hall of History for American University in Washington, D.C. They built a good number of public buildings and a small number of private residences-most notably the La Fetra Mansion in Summit, New Jersey.

The partnership was selected in 1897 to build three private residences: La Fetra Mansion; Laurel Hill, a three-story Georgian mansion in Columbia, North Carolina; and Donald McRae House in Wilmington, North Carolina. The La Fetra Mansion was designed and built by Bacon, and his design was published in the September 1901 issue of Architecture, the pre-eminent architectural professional journal of its time. The LeFetra Mansion fully exhibits Bacon's preference for Beaux-Arts Neo-Greek and Roman architectural styles. His simple and elegant lines, and his skill in dimensions and proportions, were described as expressing a stately elegance, peaceful tranquility, and sense of divine protection.
 
In 1897, Bacon was also approached by a group, which had organized to raise public and private funds to build a monument in Washington, D.C. to memorialize President Abraham Lincoln. Bacon began his conceptual, artistic, and architectural design for the Lincoln Memorial that year. He continued in the effort, although the funding to build the project was not secured until years later. The Brite and Bacon Partnership dissolved in 1902, partly resulting from Brite's disagreement over Bacon's passion and the unpaid time he spent on the memorial design.

After that, Bacon practiced under his own name with significant success, building a large number of public buildings and monuments which became renowned, until his death in 1924. His later works included the Danforth Memorial Library in Paterson, New Jersey (1908), the Ridgewood, New Jersey 1924 War Memorial in Van Neste Park; the train station in Naugatuck, Connecticut; Waterbury Hospital Waterbury, Connecticut; Court of the Four Seasons at Panama-Pacific Expo in San Francisco, 1915; World War I Memorial at Yale University, the Lincoln Memorial in Washington, D.C., the Confederate Memorial in Wilmington, North Carolina; and many other distinguished public buildings and monuments.

In 1913, Bacon was elected into the National Academy of Design as an associate member, and he became a full member in 1917.

Mature work

Bacon was very active as a designer of monuments and settings for public sculpture. He designed the Court of the Four Seasons for the 1915 Panama-Pacific Exposition in San Francisco, and the World War I Memorial at Yale University. He collaborated with sculptor Augustus Saint-Gaudens on the Sen. Mark Hanna Monument in Cleveland, Ohio, and with Daniel Chester French on numerous monuments, notably the Lincoln Memorial's pensive colossal Lincoln. Olin Memorial Library, one of Bacon's buildings at Wesleyan University, houses many of Bacon's documents and blueprints of the Lincoln Memorial.

Bacon rarely found time to design private residences. There are three known residential projects that are clearly his work. The first is the La Fetra Mansion in Summit, New Jersey, designed and built by the firm of Brite & Bacon from 1897 to 1900. Bacon skillfully integrated into a residential setting many of his signature Greek Revival and Roman Renaissance elements and proportions. The resulting elegance was astoundingly masterful. The La Fetra Mansion was commissioned by industrialist Harold A. La Fetra of the Royal Baking Powder Company, which later merged with RJR Nabisco. The second is the rustic resort "Donald McRae House" in Wilmington, North Carolina, for his close friend Donald McRae.

The third Bacon-designed private residence is Chesterwood House, which he designed for his friend, the noted sculptor Daniel Chester French, as his summer home and studio at Stockbridge, Massachusetts. Its exterior bears similarity to the La Fetra Mansion.
  
Bacon served as a member of the U.S. Commission of Fine Arts from 1921 until his death in 1924. In May 1923, President Warren G. Harding presented Bacon with the American Institute of Architects's Gold Medal, making him the 6th recipient of that honor. Bacon died of cancer in New York City, and he is buried at Oakdale Cemetery in Wilmington, North Carolina.

During World War II, a US Navy Liberty Ship was named after Bacon: the SS Henry Bacon, which was commissioned on November 11, 1942. In 1964 sculptor Joseph Kiselewski created the Henry Bacon Medal for Memorial Architecture, cast in bronze by the Medallic Arts Company, honoring Bacon.

Notable monuments and public buildings
Lincoln Memorial, Washington, DC
Danforth Memorial Library, Paterson, New Jersey
Train station in the style of an Italian villa, Naugatuck, Connecticut
Great War Memorial, ca. 1920, pink granite, Naugatuck town green, Naugatuck, Connecticut 
Van Vleck Observatory, Olin Memorial Library, the Eclectic Society House, many dormitories and other buildings at Wesleyan University, Middletown, Connecticut
Union Square Savings Bank (now Daryl Roth Theatre), Manhattan, New York City
Ambrose Swasey Pavilion (1916), Exeter, New Hampshire;
Chelsea Savings Bank, Chelsea, Massachusetts
Halle Brothers Department Store, Cleveland, Ohio
The Eseeola Lodge, Linville, North Carolina
Waterbury General Hospital, Waterbury, Connecticut
National City Bank, New Rochelle, New York
Citizens & Manufacturers National Bank, Waterbury, Connecticut
First Congregational Church, Providence, Rhode Island
Gates for the University of Virginia, Charlottesville, Virginia
Woodmere High School, Woodmere, New York
Public Bath, Brooklyn, New York
Foster Mausoleum, Upper Middleburgh Cemetery, Middleburgh, New York
Perry Memorial Arch, Seaside Park, Bridgeport, Connecticut
Illinois Centennial Monument, Chicago, IL
Westlawn Mausoleum, Omaha, Nebraska

Architectural settings, bases and exedra for sculpture
Bonney Memorial (1898), Francis Edwin Elwell, sculptor, Lowell Cemetery, Lowell, Massachusetts

Commodore George Hamilton Perkins, (1902), Daniel Chester French, sculptor, New Hampshire State House, Concord, New Hampshire
Roswell Pettibone Flower Monument, (1902), Augustus Saint-Gaudens, sculptor, Watertown, New York
Col. James Anderson Monument, (1904), Daniel Chester French, sculptor, Allegheny Square, Pittsburgh, Pennsylvania
Melvin Memorial (1906-1908), Daniel Chester French, sculptor, Sleepy Hollow Cemetery, Concord, Massachusetts

August Robert Meyer Memorial,  (1909) Daniel Chester French, sculptor, Kansas City, Missouri
Statue of Samuel Spencer, (1910) Daniel Chester French sculptor, carved by the Piccirilli Brothers, Atlanta, Georgia
James Oglethorpe Monument, (1910) Daniel Chester French sculptor, Savannah, Georgia
Burnside Fountain, (1912) by Charles Y. Harvey, Worcester Common, Worcester, Massachusetts 
Prehn Mausoleum, (1912) Karl Bitter sculptor, carved by the Piccirilli Brothers, Cedar Lawn Cemetery, Paterson, New Jersey
Abraham Lincoln 1912 statue by Daniel Chester French, Lincoln, Nebraska, 1912.
Carl Schurz Monument, (1913) Karl Bitter sculptor, Morningside Park, New York City
Henry Wadsworth Longfellow Monument, (1914), Daniel Chester French, sculptor, Longfellow Park, Cambridge, Massachusetts
Lafayette Memorial, (1917), Daniel Chester French sculptor, Prospect Park, Brooklyn, New York
Ruth Anne Dodge Memorial, (1918), Daniel Chester French sculptor, Fairview Cemetery, Council Bluffs, Iowa
Depew Memorial Fountain, (1919), Karl Bitter and Alexander Stirling Calder sculptors, University Park, Indianapolis, Indiana
Russell Alger Memorial Fountain, (1921), Daniel Chester French, sculptor, Grand Circus Park, Detroit, Michigan
Dupont Circle Fountain, (1921), Daniel Chester French sculptor, Dupont Circle, Washington, D.C.
Statue of the Marquis de Lafayette, (1921), Daniel Chester French sculptor, Easton, Pennsylvania
Alexander Hamilton Monument, (1923), James Earle Fraser sculptor, Washington D.C.
Jesse Parker Williams Memorial, (c. 1924), Daniel Chester French sculptor, Westview Cemetery, Atlanta, Georgia
American Revolutionary War Memorial, (c. 1915), Daniel Chester French sculptor, Jno. Williams, Inc. (NY) founder, Danville, Illinois

References

Notes

Bibliography
The American Institute of Architects
The American Academy of Arts & Letters
Thomas, Christopher, the Lincoln Memorial and its Architect
Thomas, Christopher, The Lincoln Memorial and American Life, 2002
The Olin Library, Wesleyan University
Kvaran, Einar Einarsson, America's Monuments, unpublished manuscript
Richman, Michael, Daniel Chester French: An American Sculptor, The Preservation Press, Washington D.C., 1976
Richman, Michael, Daniel Chester French and Henry Bacon, 1980
Tolles, Bryant and Carolyn, New Hampshire Architecture: An Illustrated Guide, New Hampshire Historical Society, Hanover, New Hampshire, 1979
Wilkinson, Burke, and David Finn, photographs,  Uncommon Clay: The Life and Works of Augustus Saint-Gaudens, Harcourt Brace Jovanovich, Publishers, San Diego  1985
Wilson, Richard Guy, The AIA Gold Medal, McGraw-Hill Book Company, New York,  1984

External links 

 Biography
 Thomas, Christopher A. "The Lincoln Memorial and Its Architect, Henry Bacon (1866-1924)" (Ph.D. diss., Yale University, 1990)
 Henry Bacon works. Held by the Department of Drawings & Archives, Avery Architectural & Fine Arts Library, Columbia University.

1866 births
1924 deaths
People from Watseka, Illinois
Architects from Illinois
Architects from New York City
Burials at Oakdale Cemetery
People from Wilmington, North Carolina
University of Illinois School of Architecture alumni
Deaths from cancer in New York (state)
Fellows of the American Institute of Architects
Recipients of the AIA Gold Medal
Members of the American Academy of Arts and Letters